The United Hospitals Challenge Cup is contested by the six medical schools in London and is most notable for being the oldest rugby cup competition in the world.

History

In 1874 the United Hospitals RFC instituted a cup competition, the United Hospitals Challenge Cup, also known as the Inter-Hospital Challenge Cup. The first final was played on Wednesday 3 March 1875 at The Oval, which had also been the site of England's first home rugby international three years earlier. The match predated by four years the first Calcutta Cup match and is the oldest cup competition in the game of rugby. The first final was contested by at 3.30pm by Guy's Hospital and St George's Hospital in front of 400 spectators. Guy's, wore an orange and blue kit, and kicked the game off, whilst their opponents wore green jersey, green shorts with brown socks. Guy's won but St George's got their revenge the next season. When this game was played matches were won by goals rather than points. A goal was a converted try, and tries themselves only value in the case of a draw in which case they would be counted up as the deciding factor. Guy's Hospital won the game by 1 Goal (a converted try) and 1 try to 2 tries. The records say that the three additional 'tries' were all defensive touch downs. The game was also notable for fielding 15 players per side at a time when all international matches, the Varsity Match, County matches and all other top level games were being played with 20 players per side and would continue to do so until 1877. In this regard, the United Hospitals RFC was a pioneer. With the exception of breaks for the two world wars of the twentieth century and COVID-19, the United Hospitals Challenge Cup has been played for without interruption since that first final.

The Royal Veterinary College was invited to join the competition for the first time after a vote was taken during the AGM on 13 May 2008.

The current holders are Barts and the London RFC who beat GKT 22-12 at The Rock, Rosslyn Park F.C.’s ground in Barnes in March 2022.

United Hospital Challenge Cup wins

Winners

 1875 Guy's
 1876 St George's
 1877 Guy's
 1878 St Thomas's
 1879 Guy's
 1880 St George's
 1881 St Bart's
 1882 St George's
 1883 St Bart's
 1884 London
 1885 London
 1886 Guy's
 1887 Middlesex
 1888 St Thomas's
 1889 St Thomas's
 1890 Guy's
 1891 Not Completed
 1892 St Thomas's
 1893 St Thomas's
 1894 St Thomas's
 1895 St Thomas's
 1896 St Thomas's
 1897 St Thomas's
 1898 Guy's
 1899 Guy's
 1900 St Mary's
 1901 Guy's
 1902 Guy's
 1903 Guy's
 1904 London
 1905 Guy's
 1906 London
 1907 Guy's
 1908 London
 1909 Guy's
 1910 Guy's
 1911 Guy's
 1912 Guy's
 1913 Guy's
 1914 London
 1915 No Competition
 1916 No Competition
 1917 No Competition
 1918 No Competition
 1919 No Competition
 1920 Guy’s
 1921 Guy’s
 1922 Guy’s
 1923 Guy’s
 1924 St Bart’s
 1925 Guy’s
 1926 St Thomas’s
 1927 Guy’s
 1928 St Bart’s
 1929 Guy’s
 1930 Guy’s
 1931 St Bart’s
 1932 Guy’s
 1933 Guy’s
 1934 St Mary’s
 1935 St Mary’s
 1936 St Mary’s
 1937 St Mary’s
 1938 St Mary’s
 1939 St Mary’s
 1940 No Competition
 1941 No Competition
 1942 No Competition
 1943 No Competition
 1944 No Competition
 1945 No Competition
 1946 St Mary's
 1947 Not Played
 1948 Guy's
 1949 St Mary's
 1950 St Thomas's
 1951 St Mary's
 1952 St Mary's
 1953 St Mary's
 1954 St Thomas's
 1955 London
 1956 St Mary's
 1957 London
 1958 St Thomas's
 1959 St Mary's
 1960 St Thomas's
 1961 Guy's
 1962 St Thomas's
 1963 St Mary's
 1964 St Thomas's
 1965 London
 1966 Guy's
 1967 St Mary's
 1968 London
 1969 St Bart's
 1970 St Bart's
 1971 Guy's
 1972 St Mary's
 1973 St Mary's
 1974 Westminster
 1975 Westminster
 1976 St Bart’s 
 1977 St Bart’s
 1978 St Mary's
 1979 St Mary's
 1980 St Mary's
 1981 St Mary's
 1982 Westminster
 1983 St Mary's
 1984 St Mary's
 1985 St Mary's
 1986 London
 1987 St Mary's
 1988 St Mary's
 1989 St Mary's
 1990 St Mary's
 1991 St Mary's
 1992 St Mary's
 1993 Charing X/ Westminster
 1994 St Mary's
 1995 Charing X/ Westminster
 1996 Charing X/ Westminster
 1997 Guy's and St. Thomas' RFC
 1998 Imperial Medicals
 1999 Imperial Medicals
 2000 Imperial Medicals
 2001 G.K.T.
 2002 Imperial Medicals
 2003 Imperial Medicals
 2004 Imperial Medicals
 2005 Imperial Medicals
 2006 Imperial Medicals
 2007 Imperial Medicals
 2008 Imperial Medicals
 2009 G.K.T.
 2010 Imperial Medicals
 2011 Imperial Medicals
 2012 Barts and The London
 2013 Barts and The London
 2014 Imperial Medicals
 2015 RUMS RFC
 2016 St George's
 2017 Barts and The London 
 2018 RUMS RFC
 2019 G.K.T.
 2020 St George's
 2020+1 No Competition
 2022 Barts and The London
 2023 Barts and The London

See also

 List of oldest rugby union competitions
 Rugby union trophies and awards

References

External links
Official Website of United Hospitals RFC

Rugby union cup competitions in England
1874 establishments in England
Recurring sporting events established in 1874
Student sport in London